Animal Grace is the eleventh studio album by Canadian rock band April Wine, released in 1984.

The first single off the album, "This Could Be the Right One", peaked at number 61 on the Billboard Hot 100. It continues to be played on radios across Canada.  The band also released "Sons Of The Pioneers".  Both singles included music videos.

Track listing 
All tracks written by Myles Goodwyn unless otherwise noted.
 "This Could Be the Right One" – 4:16
 "Sons of the Pioneers" – 5:35
 "Without Your Love" – 4:52
 "Rock Tonite" – 4:59
 "Hard Rock Kid" (Tom Lang) – 3:57
 "Money Talks" – 3:28
 "Gimme that Thing Called Love" – 5:03
 "Too Hot to Handle" – 5:04
 "Last Time I'll Ever Sing the Blues" – 4:49

Personnel 
 Myles Goodwyn – vocals, guitars, keyboards
 Brian Greenway – vocals, guitars
 Gary Moffet – guitars, background vocals
 Steve Lang – bass, background vocals
 Jerry Mercer – drums, background vocals

References 

April Wine albums
1984 albums
Aquarius Records (Canada) albums
Capitol Records albums
Albums produced by Mike Stone (record producer)
Albums produced by Myles Goodwyn